The Sobo, Katamuki and Okue Biosphere Reserve also known as  was created in 2017. It incorporates the 1965 quasi national parks of Sobo Katamuki Prefectural Natural Park (Ōita) (also previously known as the Sobo-Katamuki Quasi-National Park) and Sobo Katamuki Prefectural Natural Park (Miyazaki).

Geography
The Quasi-National Park borders two homonymous Prefectural Parks, namely the Sobo Katamuki Prefectural Natural Park (Ōita) and Sobo Katamuki Prefectural Natural Park (Miyazaki).

Geology

The landforms of the Biosphere Reserve are the heavily modified result of volcanic activity over the last 14 million years. A massive eruption about 13.7 million years ago involved the Okueyama Volcano-plutonic Complex, and measured 8.0 on the Volcanic Explosivity Index.

Biosphere
There is a large amount of farmland in the large transition zone but the more rugged buffer and core areas are important flora and fauna habitats.

Flora 
In the lower core and buffer areas the cover is by old-growth forest including Japanese beech and Tsuga. Rhododendron kiusianum, Japanese gentian and the Japanese maple grow in great numbers. At higher levels, the vegetation changes from evergreen (glossy-leaved) forest to conifer forest and then to Suzu-take and beech closer to mountain summits. A rare plant Angelica ubatakensis is found in the Sobo mountain range.

Fauna 
The Sobo salamander, a new species, was found here in 2014. The Japanese national butterfly, the great purple emperor, an endangered species, has been seen. Rare sightings have been made of the Asian black bear. Japanese dormice and sika deer are much more commonly seen.

References

External links
Sobo, Katamuki and Okue Biosphere Reserve (pdf)

Parks and gardens in Ōita Prefecture
Protected areas established in 2017
2017 establishments in Japan